The  was part of the decisive Kōzuke-Musashi Campaign during the Genkō War in Japan that ultimately ended the Kamakura Shogunate.  Fought in present-day Higashimurayama, Tokyo at the foot of the Hachikokuyama ridge on May 12, 1333, it pitted the anti-shogunate imperial forces led by Nitta Yoshisada against the forces of the pro-Shogunate  Hōjō Regency led by Sakurada Sadakuni.  The battle was an immediate follow on from the previous day's nearby Battle of Kotesashi.

The Setting
The region from the east side of the Sayama Hills through the Yanagase River was the field of several battles during Japan's Sengoku period.  The battlefield was regarded as strategically important because it was on the old road linking the provincial capital of Musashi Province with the capital of Kōzuke Province and it was also the halfway point between the Iruma and Tama rivers.

The battle
At dawn on May 12, the Imperial forces advanced upon the Shogunate forces' position at the  via the Kamakura Kaidō highway.  Since the previous day's battle at Kotesashi was indecisive, both sides had expected the battle to continue.  The chosen battlefield was a plain crisscrossed by small rivers and bordered by low-lying ridges.  The geography gave the mounted warriors room to maneuver with their commanders overlooking the battle from the surrounding ridges such as where Nitta Yoshisada raised his banner at Hachikokuyama.

The Taiheiki chronicles the events.  The Shogunate forces formed a large mass with intention of encompassing the Imperial forces.  The Imperial forces formed a wedge to protect its center.  With neither side gaining immediate advantage, the battle continued until losses forced the Shōgun's forces to retreat.  Losses were reported as relatively light for the Imperial forces but heavy for the Shōgun's.

Result
The result was a victory for the Imperial forces; having grown weary from two days of heavy fighting, they rested at the battlefield.  The Shogunate forces retreated south to Bubaigawara to await reinforcements.

Aftermath
The two armies fought again three days later at Bubaigawara and Sekido.  In less than one week, Nitta led the Imperial forces 50 kilometers south and finally eliminated the Shōgun's forces during the Siege of Kamakura.

The area was later a battlefield in 1335 during the Nakasendai Rebellion and the War of Uesugi Zenshu in 1416-1417.

References
 McCullough, Helen Craig (1959). "The Taiheiki. A Chronicle of Medieval Japan." 1959. Charles E. Tuttle Company, Tokyo, .
 Sansom, George (1963). "A history of Japan 1334-1615." Eight Printing (1993). Charles E. Tuttle Company, Tokyo, 
 Papinot, E. (1910). "Historical and Geographical Dictionary of Japan. 1972 Printing. Charles E. Tuttle Company, Tokyo, .
 On site historical signage

Notes

1330s in Japan
1333 in Asia
Conflicts in 1333
Genkō War
Battles involving Japan
14th century in Japan